State Route 338 (SR 338) is a  state highway that travels south-to-north in a sideways V-shape completely within Laurens County in the central part of the U.S. state of Georgia. It connects Cadwell with the Dublin area, via Dudley.

Route description
SR 338 begins at an intersection with SR 117 (Main Street) in Cadwell, where the roadway continues south as Old Eastman Road. The route travels to the north-northwest, to the town of Dexter, where it has a concurrency with SR 257 (North Main Street). The route continues to the north-northwest, and enters Dudley. It curves to the northeast, to an interchange with Interstate 16 (I-16; Jim Gillis Historic Savannah Parkway) in the southwestern part of the town. In the northeastern part of town, SR 338 intersects US 80/SR 19/SR 26. The route continues traveling to the northeast until it meets its northern terminus, an intersection with US 441/SR 29 northwest of Dublin. Here, the roadway continues northeast as Holly Ridge Road.

SR 338 is not part of the National Highway System, a system of roadways important to the nation's economy, defense, and mobility.

History
The highway that would eventually become SR 338 was built by the end of 1953 as an unnumbered road from Caldwell to Dudley. By mid-1954, the road had been extended to US 441/SR 29, northwest of Dublin. By mid-1963, the entire roadway was designated as SR 338.

Major intersections

See also

References

External links

338
Transportation in Laurens County, Georgia